Don Bosco Higher Secondary School is a private, English-medium, co-educational school in Irinjalakuda, Kerala, India. It was established in March 1962 on the invitation of the late Bishop of Thrissur, George Alappatt.

It began as an English-medium and a Malayalam-medium school and the Government sanctioned it as an unaided but recognised school on 6 May 1962. The Malayalam-medium section was discontinued later. A boarding section was started on 2 January 1963 but was closed later on. In 1987, an indoor stadium was built to commemorate the Silver Jubilee of the Institution.

Notable alumni 
 Innocent Vareed Thekkethala, actor and politician
 John Brittas, Journalist 
 Tovino Thomas, actor

References 

Catholic secondary schools in India
Christian schools in Kerala
High schools and secondary schools in Kerala
Schools in Thrissur district
Irinjalakuda
Educational institutions established in 1962
1962 establishments in Kerala